Vice-Admiral Sir Arthur Francis Pridham,  (3 June 1886 – 27 January 1975) was a Royal Navy officer.

Pridham joined the Royal Navy and was in January 1903 posted as naval cadet to the battleship HMS Jupiter, serving in the Channel Fleet. He remained in her until she paid off on 31 January, 1905. He was promoted to the rank of lieutenant on 1 October 1908.

He commanded several light cruisers during the late 1920s before commanding the gunnery school at HMS Excellent in 1933–1936 and then the battlecruiser  from 1936 to 1938. Pridham served as the President of the Ordnance Board in 1942–1945.

Citations

Bibliography

External links 

 The Papers of Vice-Admiral Sir (Arthur) Francis Pridham held at Churchill Archives Centre

1886 births
1975 deaths
Royal Navy admirals of World War II
Royal Navy officers of World War I
Royal Navy officers of World War II